Batteries are used on spacecraft as a means of power storage. Primary batteries contain all their usable energy when assembled and can only be discharged.  Secondary batteries can be recharged from some other energy source, such as solar panels or radioisotope-based power (RTG), and can deliver power during periods when the space vehicle is out of direct sunlight. Batteries generate electrical current from a chemical reaction.

Batteries for spacecraft must be sealed to operate in vacuum.  They must withstand the acceleration of launch, and vibration while attaining orbit. They must be able to operate over a wide temperature range, and must not emit gases that would corrode the space vehicle, disturb its trajectory,  or contaminate instruments or life support systems.  Batteries for vehicles orbiting the Earth must also resist the high ionizing radiation level above the shield of the Earth's atmosphere. Artificial satellites, such as communication satellites,  require battery systems that can withstand thousands of charge and discharge cycles over the satellite's intended life. 

Primary batteries are used for relatively short-duration tasks. Early satellites had design lives of only a few weeks or months, and could carry enough primary batteries to provide the required service life. Longer-duration tasks require a rechargeable system, where solar cells or a radioisotope generator can provide energy to recharge the battery.  A satellite near the Earth will be shadowed for half of each orbit, and so requires batteries 
to maintain operation.  Even satellites in a geosynchronous orbit experience regular "eclipse periods" of varying duration. Vehicles such as the Apollo spacecraft and the Space Shuttle required more power than could be supplied by batteries or solar panels, and so relied on hydrogen fuel cells to provide several kilowatts of power for hundreds of hours.

A reserve battery is a primary battery that keeps its chemical reactants separated until needed.  This improves the standby life of the battery, since side reactions cannot occur if the electrolyte and electrodes are separated.  In another form, the electrolyte is heated to become conductive during operation.  Such batteries may have short service lives, but are very reliable after extended storage. They are used in missiles that have long standby time, or in space probes that require power during landing on a planet.

The table below lists common battery types used in space.

See also

 List of spacecraft powered by non-rechargeable batteries
 Solar panels on spacecraft
 Nuclear power in space

References

External links
Planetary Landers and Entry Probes

Spacecraft components
Battery applications